The 11th Signal Regiment is a deployable signals regiment of the Italian Army based in Civitavecchia in Lazio. The unit was formed in 1972 as a battalion and given the number XI, which had been used by two battalions during World War II: one that served in the Western Desert Campaign and Tunisian Campaign, and one that served during the Allied invasion of Sicily. The battalion was assigned to the Army General Staff's Signal Inspectorate. In 1975 the battalion was named for the Leonessa Pass and received its own flag. In 1992 the battalion entered the newly formed 11th Signal Regiment. In 2001 the regiment reformed the Battalion "Tonale" as its second signal battalion. The regiment is assigned to the army's Signal Command and affiliated with the Army Special Forces Command.

History

World War II 
After the outbreak of World War II the Territorial Defense Command in Rome formed the command of the XI Army Connections Battalion on 4 July 1940. The battalion was assigned to the 12th Engineer Regiment in Palermo, which provided the remaining personnel. On 23 July 1940 the battalion was renamed XI Marconists Battalion, and consisted of the 124th and 127th Marconists companies, and the 137th Special Marconists Company.

The battalion participated in the Western Desert Campaign and at the eve of the Second Battle of El Alamein the battalion consisted of the 110th, 120th, and 127th Marconists companies. After the Italo-German Panzer Army Africa was defeated at El Alamein the battalion retreated with the remaining Axis forced to Tunisia, where it was disbanded and its personnel used to fill up other units.

The battalion was reformed by the 12th Engineer Regiment as VI Army Marconists Battalion on 5 January 1943. Two days later the battalion was renamed XI Army Marconists Battalion and consisted of the 140th Marconists Company and 154th Marconists Connection Company. The battalion was assigned to the 6th Army, which was tasked with the defense of Sicily. The battalion operated near Enna as unit of the 9th Engineer Grouping, when the Allied invasion of Sicily began. In the following weeks the battalion suffered heavy losses and was disbanded for a second time in August 1943.

Cold War 
On 1 March 1957 the army's Signal School in Rome reformed the battalion as XI Signal Battalion by expanding the Signal Experimentation Company. The battalion was disbanded on 1 April 1959 and its personnel was used to form the IX Signal Battalion in Anzio.

On 1 April 1972 the battalion was reformed in Bologna by reorganizing the VI Signal Battalion, which had been the signal unit of the VI Army Corps. The VI Army Corps was disbanded on 31 March 1972 and the next day the now XI Signal Battalion was assigned to the Army General Staff's Signal Inspectorate.

During the 1975 army reform the army disbanded the regimental level and newly independent battalions were granted for the first time their own flags. During the reform signal battalions were renamed for mountain passes. On 31 December 1975 the XI Signal Battalion was renamed 11th Signal Battalion "Leonessa". The battalion consisted of a command, a command and services platoon, and three signal companies. The battalion was assigned to the Army General Staff's Signal Inspectorate and had operational functions, while territorial tasks were assigned to the 10th Signal Battalion "Lanciano". On 19 July 1976 the battalion moved from Bologna to Civitavecchia. On 12 November 1976 the battalion was granted a flag by decree 846 of the President of the Italian Republic Giovanni Leone.

In 1980 the battalion was assigned to the Central Military Region. It was reassigned to Signals Inspectorate in 1983. Around the same the battalion's command and services platoon was expanded to command and services company.

Recent times 
On 31 August 1992 the 11th Signal Battalion "Leonessa" lost its autonomy and the next day the battalion entered the newly formed 11th Signal Regiment as Battalion "Leonessa". On the same date the flag of the 11th Signal Battalion "Leonessa" was transferred from the battalion to the 11th Signal Regiment.

In 2000 the regiment joined the army's C4 IEW Command. On 27 August 2001 the regiment received the reformed Battalion "Tonale" and became a projection signal regiment capable to deploy and operate outside Italy.

Current structure
As of 2023 the 11th Signal Regiment consists of:

  Regimental Command, in Civitavecchia
 Command and Logistic Support Company
  Battalion "Leonessa"
 1st Signal Company
 2nd Signal Company
 3rd Signal Company
  Battalion "Tonale"
 4th Signal Company
 5th Signal Company
 6th Signal Company

The Command and Logistic Support Company fields the following platoons: C3 Platoon, Transport and Materiel Platoon, Medical Platoon, and Commissariat Platoon.

External links
Italian Army Website: 11° Reggimento Trasmissioni

References

Signal Regiments of Italy